John Oswald is the name of:

 John Oswald (activist) (1760–1793), Scottish philosopher, writer, and revolutionary
 John Oswald (bishop) (died 1780), Anglican bishop in Ireland
 John Oswald (British Army officer) (1771–1840), British general
 John Oswald (composer) (born 1953), Canadian composer associated with the Plunderphonics project
 John Oswald (footballer), Scottish association footballer
 John Oswald (politician) (born 1939), Australian politician
 John Clyde Oswald (1872–1938), American author and magazine editor
 John H. Oswald (1830–1899), Scottish landscape and genre artist
 John W. Oswald (1917–1995), American university president
 Jani Lane (John Kennedy Oswald, 1964–2011), American musician with glam metal band Warrant
John Holt Oswald, Clerk of the United States House of Representatives from 1799 to 1801.